Singapore was a British colony for 144 years, apart from a period of occupation under the Japanese Empire from 1942 to 1945 during the Pacific War.

When the Empire of Japan surrendered to the Allies in 1945, at the end of World War II, Singapore was returned to British rule. The Straits Settlements were subsequently dissolved in 1946, and together with Cocos (Keeling) Islands and Christmas Island, Singapore became a separate Crown colony. 

The Crown colony was governed by the United Kingdom until it gained partial internal self-governance in 1955. Singapore subsequently gained full internal self-governance on 3 June 1959, at which point it became known as the State of Singapore.

Singapore went on to merge with Malaya, Sarawak and North Borneo to form Malaysia on 16 September 1963, thereby ending 144 years of British rule on the island. On 9 August 1965, Singapore was separated from Malaysia to become an independent sovereign country, due to political, economic and racial differences.

History

Post war period: return of British rule

After Japan surrendered to the Allies on 15 August 1945, there was a state of anomie in Singapore, as the British had not arrived to take control, while the Japanese occupiers had a considerably weakened hold over the populace. Incidents of looting and revenge killing were widespread.

When British troops returned to Singapore in September 1945, thousands of Singaporeans lined the streets to cheer them. Singapore was ruled by a British Military Administration (BMA) between September 1945 and March 1946, during which it also served as the headquarters of the British governor-general for Southeast Asia. However, much of the infrastructure had been destroyed, including electricity and water supply systems, telephone services, and the harbour facilities at the Port of Singapore.

There was also a shortage of food, including rice, and this led to malnutrition, disease, and rampant crime and violence. Unemployment, high food prices, and workers' discontent culminated in a series of strikes in 1947 causing massive stoppages in public transport and other services. By late 1947 the economy began to recover, facilitated by the growing demand for tin and rubber around the world. Several more years elapsed before the economy returned to pre-war levels.

From colony to state

On 1 April 1946, the Straits Settlements was dissolved and Singapore became a Crown Colony with a civil administration headed by a Governor and separated from peninsular Malaya. In July 1947, separate Executive and Legislative Councils were established and provisions were made to allow for the election of six members of the Legislative Council the next year. On 30 November 1959, the Singapore State Arms and Flag and National Anthem Ordinance 1959 was passed to regulate the use and display of the State Arms, State Flag and the performance of the National Anthem.

Merger with Malaysia

The failure of the British to defend Singapore had destroyed their credibility as infallible rulers in the eyes of the locals in Singapore. The decades after and during the war saw a political awakening amongst the local populace and the rise of nationalist and anti-colonial sentiments, including a cry for Merdeka, roughly translated to "independence" in the Malay language. The British, on their part, were prepared to embark on a program of gradually increasing self-governance for Singapore and Malaya. On 16 September 1963, Singapore became a state of Malaysia, ending 144 years of British rule on the island.

On 9 August 1965, Singapore officially left Malaysia to become the independent Republic of Singapore, due to political, economic and racial disputes .

Government

First Legislative Council (1948–1951)

The first Singaporean elections, held in March 1948 to select members of the Legislative Council, were rather limited. The right to vote was restricted to adult British subjects, of which only 23,000 or about 10 percent of those eligible registered to vote. In addition, only six of the twenty-five seats on the Legislative Council were to be elected; the rest were chosen either by the Governor or by the chambers of commerce.

Three of the elected seats were won by a newly formed Singapore Progressive Party (SPP), a conservative party whose leaders were businessmen and professionals and were disinclined to press for immediate self-rule. The other three seats were won by independents.

Three months after the elections, an armed insurgency by communist groups in Malaya – the Malayan Emergency – broke out, and the British imposed harsh measures to control left-wing groups in both Singapore and Malaya; the controversial Internal Security Act, which allowed indefinite detention without trial for persons suspected of being "threats to security", was introduced at this time.

Since the left-wing groups were the strongest critics of the colonial system, progress on self-government stalled for several years. The colonial government also tried to prevent contacts between Singaporean Chinese and China, which had just fallen under the rule of the Chinese Communist Party. Tan Kah Kee, a local businessman and philanthropist, was denied re-entry into Singapore after he made a trip to China.

Second Legislative Council (1951–1955)

A second Legislative Council election was held in 1951 with the number of elected seats increased to nine. This election was again dominated by the SPP which won six seats. This slowly contributed to the formation of a distinct government of Singapore, although colonial administration was still dominant.
 
In 1953, with the communists in Malaya suppressed and the worst of the 'Emergency' period over, the government appointed a commission, headed by Sir George Rendel, to study the possibility of self-government for Singapore. The commission proposed a limited form of self-government.

The Legislative Assembly with twenty-five out of thirty-two seats chosen by popular election would replace the Legislative Council, from which a Chief Minister as head of government and Council of Ministers as a cabinet would be picked under a parliamentary system. The British would retain control over areas such as internal security and foreign affairs, as well as veto power over legislation.

The government agreed with the recommendations, and Legislative Assembly elections were scheduled for 2 April 1955. The election was a lively and closely fought affair, with several newly formed political parties joining the fray. In contrast to previous elections, voters were automatically registered, expanding the electorate to around 300,000. The SPP was soundly defeated in the election, winning only four seats. The newly formed, left-leaning Labour Front was the largest winner with ten seats and was able to form a coalition government with the UMNO-MCA Alliance, which won three seats. Another new party, the then leftist People's Action Party (PAP), won three seats.

Administration

On 1 April 1946, the Colony of Singapore was formed with Cocos-Keeling, Christmas Island after the dissolution of the Straits Settlements. As a Crown colony, Singapore inherited the hierarchical organisational structure of the Straits Settlements government with a governor, who was assisted by an Advisory Executive Council, a Legislative Council and a Municipal Council. In July 1946, Labuan became part of the Crown Colony of North Borneo. The sovereignty of the Cocos (Keeling) Islands was transferred to Australia in 1955. The administration of Christmas Island was also transferred to Australia in 1958.

Governors of Singapore (1946–1959)

The Governors of Singapore ruled the Crown Colony of Singapore from 1946 to 1959, on behalf of the Colonial Office. When Singapore gained self-governance in 1959, the Office of the Governor was abolished.

 Bose, Romen, "THE END OF THE WAR: The Liberation of Singapore and the aftermath of the Second World War", Marshall Cavendish, Singapore, 2005

Notes

References

States and territories established in 1946
States and territories disestablished in 1963
 
History of Singapore
Singapore
1946 establishments in the British Empire
1963 disestablishments in the British Empire
Singapore and the Commonwealth of Nations